Pick Me Up is the second studio album by Canadian country music artist Brett Kissel. It was released on September 11, 2015, via Warner Music Canada. The album includes the number one single "Airwaves".

Upon release, Pick Me Up debuted at number seven on the Canadian Albums Chart.

Promotion
In the fall of 2014, Kissel opened for Brad Paisley on the Canadian leg of his then-current tour and began playing material from what would become Pick Me Up. Kissel will headline "The Airwaves Tour 2015" in promotion of Pick Me Up beginning on October 10 in Simcoe, Ontario. Dates were announced through to November 28, with additional stops to be added. He also performed at the Grand Ole Opry on August 29, 2015.

Singles
On June 19, 2015, "Airwaves" was released to digital retailers and Canadian country radio as the album's lead single. It entered the Billboard Canada Country airplay chart at number 31 as the most-added single of the week and reached the number one position on the chart dated October 3, 2015. It has also charted on the Billboard Canadian Hot 100 at number 61.

Track listing

Credits and personnel
Credits adapted from liner notes.

Recorded and engineered at
 Nashville, Tennessee 
 Saskatoon, Saskatchewan 
Mastered at
 Nashville, Tennessee 

Performance credits
 All vocals – Brett Kissel
 Featured vocas – Carolyn Dawn Johnson
 Background vocals – Mickey Jack Cones, Matty McKay, Brett Kissel, Russell Terrell, the Good Friday Choir

Instruments

 Bass – Mark Hill, Justin Kudding, Derek Stremel
 Drums – Chad Malchert, Nir Z
 Fiddle – Tyler Vollrath
 Guitars  – Mickey Jack Cones, J.T. Corenflos, Hunter Hayes, Jeff King, Brett Kissel, Troy Lancaster, B. James Lowry, Matty McKay

 Mandolin – Troy Lancaster, Matty McKay
 Piano and synthesizer – Mickey Jack Cones, Tony Harrell, Bart McKay
 Percussion – Mickey Jack Cones
 Steel guitar – Randle Currie, Mike Johnson

Production

 Engineers – Mickey Jack Cones, Bart McKay, Dave Salley
 Assistant engineers – Brady Tilow
 Management – Louis O'Reilly, Invictus Entertainment (Canada); Bob Doyle, Major Bob Music (US)
 Management Agency – Jim Cressman, Invictus Entertainment (IEG)
 Mastering – Andrew Mendelson
 Mixers – Mickey Jack Cones, Bart McKay, Brett Kissel
 Packaging designer – Patrick Duffy for Attention

 Photographer – Juan Pont Lezica
 Record producer – Mickey Jack Cones, Bart McKay, Brett Kissel
 Programming and editing – Mickey Jack Cones, Brady Tilow
 Songwriters – Cary Barlowe, Casey Beathard, Rachel Bradshaw, Chase Bryant, Jacob Bryant, Zach Crowell, John Davidson, Adrienne Follesé, Keith Follesé, Ashley Gorley, Ted Hewitt, Kyle Jacobs, Matt Jenkins, Brett Kissel, Hillary Lindsey, Tony Martin, Jake Mitchell, Jason Mizelle, Billy Montana, Phil O'Donnell, Troy Olsen, Gordie Sampson, Jonathan Singleton, Neil Thrasher, JP Williams

 Additional credits
 Hunter Hayes appears courtesy of Atlantic Recording Corporation
 Carolyn Dawn Johnson appears courtesy of Dancing Lily Music

Chart performance

Album

Singles

References

2015 albums
Brett Kissel albums
Warner Music Group albums